Love Valley, (Turkish Aşıklar Vadisi) is a valley in Göreme Historical National Park, Cappadocia, Turkey. It is known for its rock formations called fairy chimneys.

History

Geology

References

 
 
 
 Love Valley General Information.

External links 
 Cappadocia Love Valley: The Best Hiking in Cappadocia? 
 Love Valley Cappadocia – The Complete Guide 
 Love Valley Cappadocia (Where? Things to Do & See + Advice) 

Valleys of Turkey